Bruce Alexander Bilby FRS (3 September 1922 – 20 November 2013) was a British mechanical engineer, and an Emeritus Professor at the University of Sheffield.

Life
He was a graduate of Dover Grammar School for Boys.

He once taught at University of Birmingham and was the Professor of the Theory of Materials at the University of Sheffield from 1966 to 1984.
He was a colleague of Alan Cottrell.

He died aged 91 on 20 November 2013.

See also
Cottrell atmosphere
Flow plasticity theory

References

People educated at Dover Grammar School for Boys
Academics of the University of Birmingham
Academics of the University of Sheffield
British mechanical engineers
Fellows of the Royal Society
1922 births
2013 deaths